Eustace the Monk (c. 1170 – 24 August 1217), born Eustace Busket, was a mercenary and pirate, in the tradition of medieval outlaws.  The birthplace of Eustace was not far from Boulogne.  A 1243 document mentions a Guillaume le Moine, seigneur de Course, which indicates that the family lived in that vicinity.

Life

Early life
Eustace was born a younger son of Baudoin Busket, a lord of the county of Boulogne. According to his biography, he went to Toledo, Spain, and studied black magic there.  The author of the Histoire des Ducs de Normandie wrote in Eustace's own day, "No one would believe the marvels he accomplished, nor those which happened to him many times." He later returned home to become a Benedictine monk at St Samer Abbey near Calais, and then left the monastery to avenge his murdered father. Other evidence, however, suggests that his father's death occurred soon after 1190. That evidence proves that by 1202, Eustace was the seneschal and bailiff of the count of Boulogne, Renaud de Dammartin, and that in c. 1204, the two quarrelled and, accused of mishandling his stewardship, Eustace fled and was declared an outlaw. Renaud confiscated his lands and fields; Eustace burned two mills in retaliation.

Serving England
Eustace became a pirate in the English Channel and the Strait of Dover, both for his own purposes and as a mercenary of France and England. King John of England employed him intermittently from 1205 to 1212, against Philip II of France. The biography asserts that John gave him command of thirty ships at the start of this assignment. This employment involved Eustace and his brothers raiding the Normandy coast and establishing bases in the Channel Islands (he and his men held Castle Cornet in Guernsey for a considerable period). He took the island of Sark in 1205. When he raided English coastal villages, King John briefly outlawed him, but soon afterwards issued a pardon because he needed Eustace's services.

Serving France
However, Eustace switched sides in 1212 (the biography puts it down to Eustace's enemy Renaud de Dammartin allying himself with John and poisoning John's mind against Eustace) and raided Folkestone when English troops seized his Channel Island bases. When civil war broke out in England in 1215, he supported the rebel barons and ferried Prince Louis of France across the Channel to help them in 1216.

In August 1217, whilst ferrying much-needed reinforcements to Louis, Eustace met an English fleet under Hubert de Burgh sailing out of Dover. In the ensuing Battle of Dover, Eustace wrought havoc among his former allies, until the English blinded the French with powdered lime. English troops boarded his ships and defeated his men in mêlée. Eustace, his flagship and some other ships managed to escape, but his ship was surrounded on 24 August 1217 in the Battle of Sandwich by Philip d'Aubigny's English fleet of Cinque Ports ships. Eustace was found hiding in the ship's bilges and offered huge sums for his life, which his captors refused, since he had made himself so hated by the English crews. Instead, they allowed him merely the choice between the ship's rail or the side of the trebuchet (carried as deck-cargo to England) as his execution site. (Matthew Paris includes the beheading but does not specify which he chose.) His brothers survived, and continued to hold his Channel Islands base.

Aftermath
In June 1217, during the negotiations for what would be known as the Treaty of Lambeth, the English demanded the return of the Channel Islands from Eustace's control, forcibly if necessary. However, he was executed while negotiations were still ongoing and thereafter the negotiations concerned his brothers, with the same demand. The treaty eventually compelled Louis not only to give up his claim to the English throne but also to eject Eustace's brothers from the Channel Islands.

Biography
A romance biography was written on him between 1223 and 1284 by an unknown poet from Picardy, mainly interested in his year or so of adventures after leaving Renaud's service. From a forest hideout, this account tells of Eustace duping, ambushing and humiliating Renaud again and again, in different disguises and often stealing his horses. It is linked to the medieval myths of Robin Hood and the 13th-century Old French romance Fouke le Fitz Waryn on the life of Fulk FitzWarin.

This account is then supplemented from 1205 onwards by English government records.

References

Bibliography

Further reading

External links
Eustache the Monk: Introduction at Rochester.edu

1170s births
1217 deaths
French pirates
Medieval legends
French mercenaries
French outlaws
French folklore
Medieval admirals
Medieval pirates
Medieval mercenaries
Executed French people